Blue ice may refer to:

Blue ice (aviation), formed by leaky aircraft waste tanks
Blue Ice (film), a 1992 film starring Michael Caine
Blue ice (glacial), created by glaciers
Blue-ice area, area in Antarctica where sublimation of ice leads to the development of blue ice
Blue Ice (video game), a PC video game from Psygnosis
Blue Ice, a factory ring tone for Nokia cellphones such as the Nokia 1112
 The Blue Ice, a 1948 adventure novel by Hammond Innes
 Blueice, the predecessor of the Bluefire Supercomputer
 Blue Ice Beer, a beer brewed by San Miguel Brewery Hong Kong
 Methamphetamine, CNS stimulant mainly used as a recreational drug
 Rubbermaid Blue Ice, brand name for an ice pack product

See also
 Blue ice runway